Macunköy, is a surface rapid transit station of the Ankara Metro. Currently, only one line is in operation at this station. The station was opened on 29 December 1997, the same day that the M1 line opened. This station is the main depot station in Ankara Metro (the other depot station being located at Koru station). Trains are added to and removed from the system from this station. The 3rd rail is located in the middle of the station is used to store the backup train or the removal process of the trains. The addition process is done with a railway switch that connects to the mainline from the 4th line close to the station.

References

External links
EGO Ankara - Official website

Railway stations opened in 1997
Ankara metro stations
1997 establishments in Turkey
Transit centers in Ankara